St. Anthony's High School is a Catholic school for boys located in Lahore, Punjab, Pakistan. In spite of its name as a high school, the school delivers a pre-school, primary, high school and college education across three campuses in Lahore. Established in 1892 by the Capuchin Friars from Belgium, the school is part of the Roman Catholic Archdiocese of Lahore. The school's main campus is situated at Lahore's historical road, The Mall, adjacent to the Sacred Heart Cathedral.

When Lt. Col (ret) L. C. Rath was the principal in 1992, nearly 2,000 pupils were enrolled at the school with a staff of 100. As of now, the school had more than 100 qualified teachers.

The school's motto is Scientia cum Virtute translated from Latinas "Knowledge with Virtue".

History 
St. Anthony's was founded on 1 March 1892 in Peeli Kothi, Empress Road, Lahore by the Capuchin Friars from Belgium. They named it St. Anthony's Catholic Day School. Rt. Reverend Doctor Van Don Bouch performed its opening ceremony with three students at Empress Road Lahore where St. Anthony's Church and Don Bosco School stand today.

As it progressed, its site was shifted to 3-Lawrence Road, where it was renamed St. Anthony's High School in 1900 which was dedicated to St. Anthony of Padua who sympathised with the miserable and gave hope to the despaired people. The Bishop of Lahore Rt. Reverend Van Don Bouch performed the dedication ceremony. Capuchin Father Leo De Brabandere Petrus (1900 - 1902) took over as the first principal of the school and started 'O' Level classes.

In 1911 the last Capuchin Friar principal of St Anthony's, Fr Leopoldus De Ceuster Josephus (1909 - 1911), handed the school over to the Irish Brothers of St Patrick (Patrician Brothers). From 1911 to 1978 sixty Patricians ministered at the school during the 1919 Riots, World War II, and the 1947 Partitioning. During this time the school maintained its high academic reputation in Lahore and Pakistan. At the end of 1978 the Patricians handed the school over to the Irish Marist Fathers, the new principal Fr M. Donnelly (1979 - 1983). The first lay principal was Lieutenant Colonel L.C. Rath (1984 - 1993).

 Archbishop Sebastian Francis Shaw was the chairman of the board of governors, H.D.Maxwell Shanthi the executive secretary, and Shahid Ambrose Moghul the principal. There are about 1600 students and about 100 teaching staff at present. The school is upgraded to a college with the approval Archbishop Sebastian Francis Shaw in August 2013. The college was inaugurated by Cardinal Fernando Filoni in the presence of the Apostolic Nancio Edgar Pene Para and Sebastian Francis Shaw, the Archbishop of Lahore.

To honour the legendary war veteran of Pakistan Air Force, Group Captain Cecil Chaudhry (Late), Government of Pakistan has renamed a part of Lawrence Road (the road in front of St. Anthony School) as Cecil Chaudhry Road. The renaming ceremony was held at St Anthony High School on 30 November 2014. The ceremony was attended by friends and family members of the war hero, important personalities of the Christian community and significant civil and military dignitaries.

Pakistan Air Force (PAF) Central Air Command Commanding Air Officer Air Vice Marshal Mujahid Anwar Khan was the chief guest on the occasion.

Campuses

Lawrence Road 
This is the biggest campus of St. Anthony's High School in Lahore and serves as the main campus. The campus has seven buildings as following:

 Kindergarten (KG)
 Preparatory (Prep)
 Primary Section (Classes 1–5)
 Middle Section (Classes 6–8)
 Secondary Section (Classes 9 and 10, for both Matriculation and O Levels)
 Higher Secondary Section (Classes 11 and 12, for both Intermediate and A Levels)
 Offices

It boasts a large library, containing more than 1480 books on various subjects. The school also has a large hall, used for school and inter-school events. There is a basketball court and two large playgrounds. A large canteen is provided for the students and staff in the main ground.

Other campuses 
Apart from the main campus, St. Anthony's High School also has two other campuses in Lahore. They are

 St. Anthony's High School, Faisal Town, Lahore. It was founded in 1993. 
 St. Anthony's High School, Lahore Cantt, Lahore. It was founded in 2002.

Curriculum 
It offers courses leading to the Cambridge O/A levels and Matriculation. During the academic year, the school has four sets of assessments and two long examinations (Mid-years and Finals).

During Lt. Col. L.C. Rath's principalship, the school won the Educational Trophy from the Board of Secondary Education, Lahore for excellent Matriculation result.

Extra-curricular activities 
Co-curricular and extracurricular activities include debates, excursions, funday, bonfires, picnics, funfair, science model fair and annual sports. In 2006 a cricket under-13 team and an under-16 team formed part of a 47-member delegation including teachers from St Anthony's, travelled to Chandigar, India to play matches with the St John's Cricket Academy team. Cecil Chaudhry was Principal of St Anthony's High School at the time. Students took part in debates and quiz programmes in countries, and in cities of Pakistan.

In 2014, the school restarted publishing The Anthonian annual magazine. The last magazine was had been last published in the year 1992. The tradition was followed on; as on 4 February 2015, the inauguration for The Anthonian was held in the school hall.

Notable alumni

Politicians 
 Shehbaz Sharif, Prime Minister of Pakistan
 Nawaz Sharif, former Prime Minister of Pakistan
 Salmaan Taseer, former Governor of Punjab
Sardar Ayaz Sadiq, Speaker of National Assembly Pakistan
Khurshid Mahmud Kasuri, former Minister of Foreign Affairs (Pakistan)
 Ishaq Dar, former Finance Minister of Pakistan
 Salman Shah, former Finance Minister of Pakistan
 Ahmad Mukhtar, former Defence Minister of Pakistan
 Mushahid Hussain, former Minister of Information of Pakistan
 Khalid Ranjha, former vice Chairman Punjab Bar Council and Federal Minister for Law
 Jamil Ahmad Gondal, founder of first virtual political party Pakistan Socialist Democratic Party-not registered

Armed forces 
 Major Shabbir Sharif NH SJ Shaheed
 Group Captain (R) Cecil Chaudhry SJ
 Squadron Leader (R) Sarfaraz Ahmed Rafiqui HJ SJ
 Major General (R) Iftikhar Janjua HJ
 Lt. General (R) Jagjit Singh Arora. former C-in-C of India.
 Air Chief Marshal (R) D. A. La Fontaine PVSM AVSM. Former Chief of the Air Staff, India.
 Maj. Gen. Noel Israel Khokhar
Brigadier Samson Simon Sharaf, Advisor on Defence, Pakistan Tehreek-e-Insaf
Brigadier Naeem Ahmad,Batch of 1964

Nuclear scientists 
 Samar Mubarakmand
 Abdul Qadeer Khan

Education 
 Shoaib Hashmi
 Ishtiaq Ahmed, Professor Emeritus of Political Science, Stockholm University; Honorary Senior Fellow, Institute of South Asian Studies (ISAS), National University of Singapore
 Humza Bin Masood Writer
 Talal Asad, Professor of Anthropology at the CUNY Graduate Center and influential scholar of religion

Sportsmen 
 Rameez Raja, former Captain Pakistan Cricket Team, commentator
 Wasim Raja
 Saleem Altaf
 Majid Khan, former Captain Pakistan Cricket Team
 Javed Burki
 Shahbaz Ahmad
 Adnan Ahmed
 Duncan Sharpe, former Pakistan Cricket Team

Judiciary 
 Naeem Bukhari, Advocate Supreme Court of Pakistan
 Anwar Kamal, former President LHCBA
 Justice Sarmad Jalal Osmany, Chief Justice Sindh High Court
 Justice Tejinder Pal Singh Chawla, former Judge Delhi High Court

Media 
 Shoaib Hashmi
 Moammar Rana
 Faisal Rehman
 Asif Raza Mir
 Usman Peerzada, owner of Rafi Peer Theater group
 Najam Sethi

Religious leaders 
 Lawrence Saldanha, Former Archbishop of Lahore (2001-2011)
 Joseph Coutts, Archbishop of Karachi

Civil service 
 Syed Hassan Raza, Diplomat, Ambassador of Pakistan to the State of Qatar
 S. Azmat Hassan
 Babar W. Malik
 Asim Ahmad, Secretary Revenue Division / Chairman Federal Board of Revenue

Journalism 
Tariq Ali, British political activist, writer, journalist, historian, filmmaker, and public intellectual
Najam Sethi, TV anchor, Editor-in-chief Friday Times and former Chairman of Pakistan Cricket Board
 Rashed Rahman, Editor Daily Times

Other professions 
 Ishtiaq Ahmed, political scientist
 Jimmy Engineer
Shahid Ahmed (Business leader and innovator)
Zarrar Mahmood (Chartered Accountant and Partner Big 4)
Christopher Sharaf Member Paigham-e-Pakistan and Pioneer Member Saiban-e-Pakistan The State's Narrative also Senior Projects Officer at the Christian Study Centre Rawalpindi, is also a Management Consultant

References 

Educational institutions established in 1892
Schools in Lahore
The Mall, Lahore
Boys' schools in Pakistan
Catholic elementary and primary schools in Pakistan
Catholic secondary schools in Pakistan
1892 establishments in British India